Vlada Ilyenko (born 17 March 1976) is a Russian sailor. She competed in the women's 470 event at the 2004 Summer Olympics.

References

External links
 

1976 births
Living people
Russian female sailors (sport)
Olympic sailors of Russia
Sailors at the 2004 Summer Olympics – 470
Sportspeople from Bălți